The Blackwater or Munster Blackwater (The Great River) is a river which flows through counties Kerry, Cork, and Waterford in Ireland. It rises in the Mullaghareirk Mountains in County Kerry and then flows in an easterly direction through County Cork, through Mallow and Fermoy. It then enters County Waterford where it flows through Lismore, before abruptly turning south at Cappoquin, and finally draining into the Celtic Sea at Youghal Harbour. In total, the Blackwater is 169 km (105 mi) long.
The total catchment area of the River Blackwater is 3,324 km2.
The long term average flow rate of the River Blackwater is 89.1 cubic metres per second (m3/s)
The Blackwater is notable for being one of the best salmon fishing rivers in the country. Like many Irish rivers, salmon stocks declined in recent years, but the Irish government banned commercial netting of salmon off the coast of Ireland in November 2006.

Tributaries
Tributaries of the Blackwater include:
 River Awbeg (An Abha Bheag, "the small river")
 River Dalua (Abhainn Dalua)
 River Bride (An Bhríd)
 River Allow (Abhainn Ealla)
 River Araglin (An Airglinn)
 River Finnow (An Fhionnabha, "the fair river")
 River Funshion (Abhainn na Fuinseann, "the ash river")

Settlements
Towns along the river are Youghal, Cappoquin, Lismore, Fermoy, Mallow and Rathmore.

Special Protection Area

The Blackwater Estuary was listed on the Ramsar List of Wetlands of International Importance on 11 June 1996. It is also a Special Protection Area (SPA) under the E.U. Birds Directive, the SPA extends from Youghal New Bridge to the Ferry Point peninsula, near the outflow of the river to the sea. The SPA encompasses a section of the main channel of the River Blackwater as far as Ballynaclash Quay as well as the channel between Kinsalebeg and Moord Cross Roads on the eastern side and part of the estuary of the Tourig River as far upstream as Kilmagner. The tidal flats attract numbers of waders and wildfowl and the species named as targets for conservation within the SPA include an internationally important population of black-tailed godwit as well as nationally important populations of Eurasian wigeon, European golden plover, Northern lapwing, dunlin, bar-tailed godwit, Eurasian curlew and common redshank. Other notable species occurring within the SPA are pale-bellied brent goose, common shelduck, Eurasian teal, mallard, Northern shoveler, red-breasted merganser, great cormorant, little egret, grey heron,  Eurasian oystercatcher, common ringed plover, grey plover, red knot, common greenshank and ruddy turnstone.  Little egret, European golden plover and bar-tailed godwit are listed on Annex I of the E.U. Birds Directive.

References

External links

Special Area of Conservation
Salmon fishing on the Munster Blackwater, from Salmon Ireland
The Munster Blackwater and associated navigations
The Lombardstown to Mallow Canal

Ramsar sites in the Republic of Ireland
Rivers of County Cork
Rivers of County Kerry
Rivers of County Waterford
Mallow, County Cork